Fabrizio Paolucci  (1651–1726) was an Italian cardinal in the Roman Catholic Church.

Fabrizio Paolucci may also refer to:
 Fabrizio Paolucci (1726–1810), marquis (marchese) of the patrician Paolucci family
 Fabrizio Paolucci (bishop) (1565–1625), Roman Catholic prelate who served as Bishop of Città della Pieve